Himatium is a genus of snout and bark beetles in the family Curculionidae. There are at least two described species in the genus Himatium.

Species
 Himatium conicum LeConte, 1880
 Himatium errans LeConte, 1876

References

Further reading

External links

 

Cossoninae